The 2016 FIA World Rally Championship-2 was the fourth season of the World Rally Championship-2, an auto racing championship recognized by the Fédération Internationale de l'Automobile, ran in support of the World Rally Championship. It was created when the Group R class of rally car was introduced in 2013. The Championship was open to cars complying with R4, R5, and Super 2000 regulations. The Championship was composed of thirteen rallies, and drivers and teams had to nominate a maximum of seven events. The best six results counted towards the championship.

After winning in 2015 and 2014, Nasser Al-Attiyah didn't participate in the 2016 season. The Qatari driver decided to focus on the 2016 Dakar Rally and on training for the 2016 Summer Olympics, in attempt to win a medal in the Men's Skeet event.

Calendar

Regulation changes

 The Production Cup for Drivers and Co-driver will be discontinued after 2015.

Teams and drivers

Results and standings

Season summary

FIA World Rally Championship-2 for Drivers

Points are awarded to the top ten classified finishers.

Notes
  – Points earned as Peugeot Sport Slovakia entry.
  – Points earned as The Ptock entry.

FIA World Rally Championship-2 for Co-Drivers

FIA World Rally Championship-2 for Teams

References

External links
Official website of the World Rally Championship
Official website of the Fédération Internationale de l'Automobile

 
World Rally Championship 2